Timber Queen is a 1944 American lumberjack drama film directed by Frank McDonald.

It was Arlen's last film for Pine-Thomas for a number of years until Speed to Spare (1948).

Plot 
Russ Evans gets out of the service and meets Elaine, the widow of Ken, a man he served with. He helps her protect the rights to some timber land that she has inherited.

Cast 
Richard Arlen as Russell (Russ) Evans
Mary Beth Hughes as Elaine Graham
June Havoc as Lil Boggs
Sheldon Leonard as Smacksie Golden
George E. Stone as Squirrel
Dick Purcell as Milt Holmes
Charles Anthony Hughes as Harold Talbot
Edmund MacDonald as Joe Birsdell
William Haade as Rawson
Clancy Cooper as Barney
Dewey Robinson as Wenzel
Horace McMahon as Rodney
Jimmy Ames as Strudel

Production
The film was originally called Timberman. Pine-Thomas signed Mary Beth Hughes to make this film and a musical The Duchess Rides High.

Filming took place in July 1943.

The film was slanted more towards comedy than many earlier Pine-Thomas films.

References

External links 

Timber Queen at TCMDB
Timber Queen at BFI
Review of film at ''Variety'

1944 films
1944 drama films
American drama films
1940s English-language films
American black-and-white films
Films directed by Frank McDonald
Films set in forests
Films about lumberjacks
1940s American films